Alice Varnado Harden (April 17, 1948 – December 6, 2012) was a Democratic member of the Mississippi Senate, representing the 28th District from 1988 until her death.

Biography
Senator Harden was born April 17, 1948, in Pike County. She was an active member of St. James Baptist Church and was married to Dennis Labert Harden. Senator Harden was a classroom teacher/educator and member of the MS Association of Educators/NEA, Alpha Kappa Alpha sorority, Women's Political Network, National Council of Negro Women, The League of Women Voters and a life member of the NAACP. Additionally, she was a member of NOBEL Women, the National Conference of State Legislators, the National Black Caucus of State Legislators and chaired the Southern Legislative Conference's Education Committee and the MS Advisory Council to the US Civil Rights Commission. She represented Mississippi on the Education Commission of the States. She died on December 6, 2012.

Education
Jackson State University, Bachelor of Science & Master of Science

State Senate Committee Membership
Enrolled Bills – Chair
Appropriations
Corrections
Education
Fees, Salaries and Administration
Housing
Interstate and Federal Cooperation
Universities and Colleges

References

External links
Mississippi State Senate - Alice Harden official government website
Project Vote Smart - Senator Alice Varnado Harden (MS) profile
Follow the Money – Alice Harden
2007 2005 2003 1999 campaign contributions

Mississippi state senators
1948 births
2012 deaths
People from Pike County, Mississippi
Jackson State University alumni
Women state legislators in Mississippi
20th-century American politicians
20th-century American women politicians
21st-century American politicians
21st-century American women politicians